Heinz Cibulka (born 16 January 1943) is an Austrian photographer and assemblage artist.

References

External links

1943 births
Living people
Austrian photographers